"Apagorevmeno" (Forbidden) is the lead single from Greek singer Anna Vissi's 2008 album Apagorevmeno. It is composed by Patrick Leonard and Kara DioGuardi, with lyrics by Eleana Vrahali. It was released on November 26, 2008 to radio stations, as well as debuting on the online music store of main sponsor Cosmote. The song was used by Cosmote in their advertising campaigns, including a television advertisement with Vissi.

Music video
The music video premiered on Vissi's official website on December 14, 2008. It received a nomination for best direction at the MAD Video Music Awards.

Charts
The single debuted at number four on the Greek Singles Chart by Billboard. It peaked at number one on Christmas week and remained atop for two weeks in total.

References

External links
 

2008 singles
Anna Vissi songs
2008 songs
Sony BMG singles
Songs written by Eleana Vrahali
Songs written by Kara DioGuardi
Songs written by Patrick Leonard